Mauricio Godoy (born 2 April 1997) is a Chilean footballer who plays for San Marcos on loan from Huachipato.

References

1997 births
Living people
Chilean footballers
Chilean Primera División players
C.D. Huachipato footballers
San Marcos de Arica footballers
Association football midfielders
People from Cautín Province